The 1921 Detroit Tigers season was their second in the league. The team failed to improve on their previous output of 2–3–3 (when the team was still known as the Heralds), winning only one game.

The team folded after the November 13 game and most of its players were allocated to the Buffalo All-Americans for the rest of the year.

Schedule

 Games in italics are against non-NFL teams.

Standings

Players
Butch Brandau, kicker, 4 games, 192 pounds
Charlie Carman, guard, 6 games, 215 pounds, 5-10, Vanderbilt		
Walt Clago, end, 6 games, 195 pounds, 6-0, Univ. of Detroit
Frank Coughlin, tackle, 2 games, 220 pounds, 6-3, Notre Dame	
Neno DaPrato, fullback, 6 games, 185 pounds, 5-10, Michigan St.
Cy DeGree, tackle, 7 games, 210 pounds, 6-1, Notre Dame
Pat Dunne, 2 games, 182 pounds		
Moose Gardner, guard, 7 games, 220 pounds, 6-1, Wisconsin
Buck Gavin, back, 3 games, 179 pounds, 5-10	
Charlie Guy, center, 7 games, 170 pounds, 6-0, Dartmouth, Washington & Jefferson	
Steamer Horning, tackle, 7 games, 198 pounds, 6-0, Colgate
Earl Krieger, fullback, 5 games, 185 pounds, 5-11, Ohio
Waddy Kuehl, back, 6 games, 165 pounds, 5-9, St. Ambrose, Dubuque
Blake Miller, back, 3 games, 170 pounds, 5-7, Michigan St.
Eddie Moegle, back, 4 games, 186 pounds, 5-9, Univ. of Detroit
Norb Sacksteder, tailback, 7 games, 173 pounds, 5-9, Dayton, Christian Brothers (MO)	
Bill Stobbs, back, 7 games, 165 pounds, 5-7, Washington & Jefferson
Don Straw, guard, 1 game, 210 pounds, 5-11, Washington & Jefferson	
Tillie Voss, end, 7 games, 207 pounds, 6-3, Univ. of Detroit	
Vic Whitmarsh, end 3 games, 190 pounds, 5-11, Syracuse
Pryor Williams, guard, 3 games, 226 pounds, 6-1, Auburn, Vanderbilt

References

Detroit Tigers (NFL) seasons
Detroit Tigers (NFL)
Detroit Tigers (NFL)